Instruments used in Forensics, including 
autopsy dissections are as follows:

Instrument list 

Serological, chemical and genetic testings are done by the respective 
people of these branches.

Image gallery

References 

 
 
 
 

Anatomy
Medical equipment